Eptescini is a tribe of bats in the family Vespertilionidae. This tribe has a cosmopolitan distribution.

Species 
Species in the tribe include:

 Genus Arielulus
 Bronze sprite, Arielulus circumdatus
 Coppery sprite, Arielulus cuprosus
 Social sprite, Arielulus societatis
Genus Eptesicus – house bats
 Anatolian serotine, Eptesicus anatolicus
 Little black serotine, Eptesicus andinus
 Bobrinski's serotine, Eptesicus bobrinskoi
 Botta's serotine, Eptesicus bottae
 Brazilian brown bat, Eptesicus brasiliensis
 Chiriquinan serotine, Eptesicus chiriquinus
 Diminutive serotine, Eptesicus diminutus
 Horn-skinned bat, Eptesicus floweri
 Argentine brown bat, Eptesicus furinalis
 Big brown bat, Eptesicus fuscus
 Gobi big brown bat, Eptesicus gobiensis
 Guadeloupe big brown bat, Eptesicus guadeloupensis
 Long-tailed house bat, Eptesicus hottentotus
 Harmless serotine, Eptesicus innoxius
 Meridional serotine, Eptesicus isabellinus
 Japanese short-tailed bat, Eptesicus japonensis
 Kobayashi's bat, Eptesicus kobayashii
 Langer's serotine, Eptesicus langeri
 Eptesicus lobatus
 Northern bat, Eptesicus nilssonii
 Ognev's serotine, Eptesicus ognevi
Orinoco serotine (Eptesicus orinocensis)
 Oriental serotine, Eptesicus pachyomus
 Thick-eared bat, Eptesicus pachyotis
 Lagos serotine, Eptesicus platyops
 Serotine bat, Eptesicus serotinus
 Taddei's serotine, Eptesicus taddeii
 Sombre bat, Eptesicus tatei
 Ulapes serotine, Eptesicus ulapesensis
 Genus Glauconycteris – butterfly bats
 Allen's striped bat, Glauconycteris alboguttata
 Silvered bat, Glauconycteris argentata
 Blackish butterfly bat, Glauconycteris atra
 Beatrix's bat, Glauconycteris beatrix
 Curry's bat, Glauconycteris curryae
 Bibundi bat, Glauconycteris egeria
 Glen's wattled bat, Glauconycteris gleni
 Allen's spotted bat, Glauconycteris humeralis
 Kenyan wattled bat, Glauconycteris kenyacola
 Machado's butterfly bat, Glauconycteris machadoi
 Abo bat, Glauconycteris poensis
 Pied butterfly bat, Glauconycteris superba
 Variegated butterfly bat, Glauconycteris variegata
 Genus Hesperoptenus – false serotine bats
 Blanford's bat, Hesperoptenus blanfordi
 False serotine bat, Hesperoptenus doriae
 Gaskell's false serotine, Hesperoptenus gaskelli
 Tickell's bat, Hesperoptenus tickelli
 Large false serotine, Hesperoptenus tomesi
 Genus Histiotus – big-eared brown bats
 Strange big-eared brown bat, Histiotus alienus
 Cadena-García's big-eared brown bat, Histiotus cadenai
 Colombian big-eared brown bat, Histiotus colombiae
 Transparent-winged big-eared brown bat, Histiotus diaphanopterus
 Humboldt big-eared brown bat, Histiotus humboldti
 Thomas's big-eared brown bat, Histiotus laephotis
 Big-eared brown bat, Histiotus macrotus
 Southern big-eared brown bat, Histiotus magellanicus
Moche big-eared brown bat, Histiotus mochica
 Small big-eared brown bat, Histiotus montanus
 Tropical big-eared brown bat, Histiotus velatus
 Genus Ia
 Great evening bat, Ia io
 Genus Lasionycteris
 Silver-haired bat, Lasionycteris noctivagans
 Genus Scoteanax
 Rüppell's broad-nosed bat, Scoteanax rueppellii
 Genus Scotomanes
 Harlequin bat, Scotomanes ornatus
 Genus Scotorepens - lesser broad-nosed bats
 Inland broad-nosed bat, Scotorepens balstoni
 Little broad-nosed bat, Scotorepens greyii
 Eastern broad-nosed bat, Scotorepens orion
 Northern broad-nosed bat, Scotorepens sanborni
 Genus Thainycteris
 Collared sprite, Thainycteris aureocollaris
 Necklace sprite, Thainycteris torquatus

References 

Bats
Mammal tribes
Vesper bats